René M. Stulz is a professor of finance at the Fisher College of Business at the Ohio State University. He earned his Ph.D. in economics at the Massachusetts Institute of Technology and has taught at a variety of universities including the University of Rochester, the University of Chicago, Harvard University, Northwestern University, and the University of Southern California. He has published over 100 articles in finance and economic journals on topics ranging from corporate finance, corporate governance, asset pricing, financial institutions, and risk management, which have been cited over 47,000 times. He served as editor of the Journal of Financial Economics from 1982 to 1987 and the Journal of Finance from 1988 to 2000.

References

External links 
 Faculty website
 Google scholar page
 SSRN author page
 NBER author page

Living people
Ohio State University faculty
Year of birth missing (living people)
MIT School of Humanities, Arts, and Social Sciences alumni
20th-century American economists
The Journal of Finance editors
Presidents of the American Finance Association